Roger Alexander Conant is an American political operative, communications and media strategist and consultant. He served as Communications Director for Marco Rubio's 2016 presidential campaign and is a founding partner of Firehouse Strategies, a consulting firm.

Family and education
Conant was born in New York and grew up in Sunfish Lake, Minnesota, as a son of Ingrid J. Conant and Roger R. Conant. His mother manages two farms in Lime Springs, Iowa, and his father was the chairman and chief investment officer of Magni Asset Management in Minneapolis. Conant graduated from St. Paul Academy in 1998 and subsequently obtained a bachelor's degree in economics and a master's degree in public affairs from the University of Wisconsin-Madison. During his time at university, he served as the editor-in-chief of the student daily, The Badger Herald.

Career

Early career
Conant gained his first experience in the political sector during his time at high-school. 
In 1996, he volunteered for Rudy Boschwitz's Senate campaign and subsequently served on Norm Coleman's mayoral re-election campaign in 1997 and on his race for governor of Minnesota in 1998. After graduating high-school, Conant deferred his university entry, to continue serving on the campaign of Coleman until 1999 and while at university, he then served on Coleman's 2002 U.S. Senate campaign. Following his time at university, in 2005 Conant started serving as press secretary for Senator John Thune of South Dakota and in 2006 he became deputy press secretary for the Office of Management and Budget and then served as a regional White House spokesman for George W. Bush.

In 2008, following his time at the White House, Conant then served as the national press secretary for the Republican National Committee (RNC). Campaigns and Elections commented on his time at the RNC "If you're a reporter in Washington, you know Alex Conant. As the RNC's national press secretary during the 2008 election, Conant waged an assault on the media's e-mail inboxes—but he did it in a friendly way."

Tim Pawlenty 2012 presidential campaign
Beginning in 2009, Conant then advised Minnesota Governor Tim Pawlenty. He first served as his communications director and subsequently as his national press secretary, during Pawlenty's 2012 presidential campaign.

Marco Rubio press secretary
In 2011, Conant was hired as a spokesman and advisor to Marco Rubio, for whom he served for over five years. He first worked as press secretary in Rubio's Senate office before he joined the presidential campaign. He later also served as a senior advisor on Rubio's Senate re-election campaign.

Joni Ernst 2014 U.S. Senate campaign
In 2014, Conant served as a senior advisor on Joni Ernst's 2014 Iowa senatorial campaign. Together with his wife, Conant was sent by the National Republican Senatorial Committee to support Ernst towards the end of her campaign. Politico commented "two respected Capitol spokesmen with presidential campaign experience" had been sent to support Ernst and Conant, who was still working for Rubio, stated: "As you know, Marco was an early supporter of Ernst and his team is doing everything we can to help out. It'll be great to have a woman, soldier, and independent leader like her in the Senate."

Marco Rubio 2016 presidential campaign
In March 2015, Conant moved from Rubio's Senate office to his Political Action Committee (PAC), and in April was officially announced as the presidential campaign's communications director and subsequently served as the campaign's senior spokesman. Conant made headlines when in March 2016, CNN cancelled an interview with him, after he had criticized the network's report that Rubio's campaign was debating to suspend operations. He also helped Rubio make a strategic turnaround, regarding his position on immigration reforms and later served as communications advisor for Rubio's 2016 U.S. Senate campaign.

Firehouse strategies
Conant is a founding partner of the political consulting firm Firehouse Strategies. Firehouse Strategies was launched in June 2016 by Conant, Terry Sullivan, and Will Holley, and specializes in fast-paced communications strategies.

Political commentator, speaker and author
Conant has worked on every national election in the last 15 years and is frequently invited on all major networks, including Fox News, CNN, CNN International, MSNBC and CNBC, to discuss politics and communications. He serves as political contributor to CBS News and has written articles published in major publications like Politico, The Wall Street Journal and The Weekly Standard.

He was named "One of the GOP's best-connected operatives in Washington and a familiar face on talk shows" and is a requested national and international speaker.

Private life
Conant married Caitlin O'Connor Dunn, a communications executive, in 2014. The couple is based in Washington, DC.

References

Year of birth missing (living people)
Living people
White House Press Secretaries
Republican National Committee
University of Wisconsin–Madison College of Letters and Science alumni
Chief investment officers
Robert M. La Follette School of Public Affairs alumni